Rasbora vulcanus is a species of ray-finned fish in the genus Rasbora native to Sumatra.

References 

Rasboras
Freshwater fish of Sumatra
Taxa named by Heok Hui Tan
Fish described in 1999